The Golf Club of Houston is a private golf club in unincorporated Harris County, Texas, near Humble and northeast of Houston. The club contains two 18-hole courses; the Member Course is private, while the Tournament Course is open to the public. The Tournament Course was designed by Rees Jones and tour pro David Toms.

The club hosted the Houston Open from 2003–2019.

History
The original 18-hole golf course on the location was El Dorado Country Club. It was designed by George Fazio in 1964, and included a log cabin style clubhouse, which had been a private home, and a small swimming pool surrounded by tall pine trees.  El Dorado Country Club was closed in the early 1990s, a victim of a suffering Houston economy following the oil bust.  The original clubhouse was demolished.

The Redstone Golf Club was then established in 2002. The first phase of Redstone Golf Club opened in July 2002 with a new 18-hole course designed by Jacobsen-Hardy Golf Design. It also included clubhouse facilities, maintenance facilities, and restaurant.

The club was purchased by Escalante Golf of Fort Worth in April 2013 and renamed that December to the Golf Club of Houston.

Scorecard

References

External links

Coverage of the Shell Houston Open on the PGA Tour's official site 

Golf clubs and courses in Texas
Sports venues in Houston
Golf in Houston